Brenierea insignis is a species of flowering plants in the legume family, Fabaceae. It belongs to the subfamily Cercidoideae and is the only member of the genus Brenierea.

References

Cercidoideae
Monotypic Fabaceae genera